Nicolás Martín Gorobsov (born 25 November 1989) is an Argentine professional footballer who plays as a midfielder for Žalgiris.

After starting out in Argentina, he went on to compete professionally in Italy and Romania. Gorobsov operates primarily as a central midfielder, but is also comfortable at playing both in attack and defense.

Early life
As a child, Gorobsov lived in San Pedro, north of Buenos Aires, before his family decided to move out of Argentina and settle in Italy. He is of Russian origin from the paternal line, making him eligible to represent Russia alongside Italy and Argentina.

Club career

Early years / Vicenza
Gorobsov, who started as a trequartista in Argentina, switched to a position in the center of the field in Italy. During the 2007–08 season, he played 22 matches for Vicenza Calcio's Primavera team, scoring two goals, as well playing once for the seniors in Serie B. After being promoted to the first team before the 2008–09 season, he came to prominence, earning himself 15 caps and a reputation of hot prospect for the future.

Torino and loans
In June 2009, Torino F.C. acquired half of player's rights for €800,000 (€100,000 plus Saša Bjelanović). On 31 August 2010, he was loaned out to A.C. Cesena. On 5 September 2011, he was loaned out again, this time to Romanian Liga II club FC Politehnica Timișoara. In June 2012, Gorobsov was signed fully by Torino for free. Gorobsov was deemed surplus to requirements and never included into the first team squad for Serie A. In January 2013, he moved on loan to Lega Pro Prima Divisione club Nocerina. On 25 July 2013, he signed with ACS Poli Timișoara, the team considered to be the successor of the dissolved FC Politehnica Timișoara.

ASA Târgu Mureș
In July 2014, Gorobsov was released by Torino and joined ASA Târgu Mureș. His side ended the Liga I season second place, therefore playing the 2015 Romanian Supercup against FC Steaua București, a match they won 1–0. Eventually, he made 67 appearances and scored 6 goals all competitions comprised during his two years with "The Red-Blues".

Hapoel Tel Aviv
In June 2016, he signed a 3-year contract with Hapoel Tel Aviv F.C. from the Israeli Premier League.

Voluntari
On 29 June 2019, Gorobsov signed a one-year contract with Liga I side Voluntari.

Sūduva
In September 2020 he became a member of Lithuanian FK Sūduva.

Žalgiris
In January 2022 he signed with FK Žalgiris.

Personal life
Gorobsov's passions, besides football, are cars and tattoos. He has written every name of his family members on the arm.

Honours

Club
Politehnica Timișoara
Liga II: 2011–12

ASA Târgu Mureș
Supercupa României: 2015

References

External links
AIC Football profile

1989 births
Living people
Sportspeople from Buenos Aires Province
Argentine footballers
Argentine expatriate footballers
L.R. Vicenza players
Torino F.C. players
A.C. Cesena players
A.S.G. Nocerina players
FC Politehnica Timișoara players
ACS Poli Timișoara players
ASA 2013 Târgu Mureș players
Hapoel Tel Aviv F.C. players
CS Concordia Chiajna players
FC Voluntari players
Serie A players
Serie B players
Serie C players
Liga I players
Liga II players
Israeli Premier League players
A Lyga players
Expatriate footballers in Italy
Expatriate footballers in Romania
Expatriate footballers in Israel
Expatriate footballers in Lithuania
Argentine expatriate sportspeople in Israel
Argentine expatriate sportspeople in Italy
Argentine expatriate sportspeople in Romania
Argentine expatriate sportspeople in Lithuania
Association football midfielders
Argentine people of Russian descent
Italian people of Russian descent